Héctor Manzanilla Rangel (born June 28, 1985 in Los Teques, Miranda) is a Venezuelan bantamweight boxer who has won a bronze medal at the Central American Games. He is most respected for giving amateur superstar Guillermo Rigondeaux one of the toughest fights of his career.

Career
At the Central American Games 2006 he lost to Mexican Arturo Santos Reyes in the semis.

At the ALBA Games in May 2007 in his home country he gave two-time Olympic champion who came into this fight on a 96 bout winning streak since 2003 one of his toughest fights losing only on countback +8:8 (36:38). (The 5:0 score on Rigondeaux's amateur record is misleading, all five judges voted for him).

He didn't participate in the PanAm Games 2007.

At the 2007 World Amateur Boxing Championships where he lost to Enkhbatyn Badar-Uugan in the quarter final he qualified for the Olympics.

As of 2007 his record is 179-15.

External links
 Central American Games 2006
 World Championships 2007
 Bio/Record (Spanish)

Living people
Bantamweight boxers
Boxers at the 2008 Summer Olympics
Olympic boxers of Venezuela
People from Los Teques
1985 births
Venezuelan male boxers
Central American and Caribbean Games bronze medalists for Venezuela
Competitors at the 2006 Central American and Caribbean Games
South American Games gold medalists for Venezuela
South American Games medalists in boxing
Competitors at the 2006 South American Games
Central American and Caribbean Games medalists in boxing
20th-century Venezuelan people
21st-century Venezuelan people